Mount Scott is a prominent mountain just to the northwest of Lawton, Oklahoma rising to a height of  and is located in the Wichita Mountains near Fort Sill Military Reservation and lies in the Wichita Mountains National Wildlife Refuge (WMWR). The US Fish and Wildlife Service is responsible for the maintenance of the area. Visitors can reach the summit by car or bicycle via a three-mile paved road. Hiking is allowed, although there are no formal trails and the paved road is open to pedestrians and bicycles from 6am to 9:30 am only.  Mount Scott is also popular for its numerous rock climbing areas.  The peak was named in honor of General Winfield Scott.

Geography
The Wichita Mountains National Wildlife Refuge is located in southwestern Oklahoma, just north of the city of Lawton and Fort Sill. The Wildlife Refuge's proximity to Fort Sill means that the sound of artillery fire can often be heard by visitors and is sometimes mistaken for thunder. Mount Scott often was used for training artillery geodetic computers and future Army Survey School candidates in the WW II era. Living in true tar paper barracks before being sent overseas or for more training at other bases.

Mount Scott is the second-highest mountain in the Wichita Mountains Wildlife Refuge, but it remains the most well-known and regularly visited. The 3+ mile paved road that winds from the base to the top of Mount Scott offers breath-taking views of the surrounding Oklahoma plains. Mount Pinchot lies several miles to the west and is the highest point in the Refuge being 12 feet taller.  Mount Pinchot is located within the Wildlife Refuge's Special Use Area which is reserved for wildlife management and closed to the public. From the west side of Mount Scott can be seen several prominent mountains to the west including Elk Mountain, Mount Sheridan, and Haley peak which lies just outside the NW corner of the WMWR. Haley Peak (officially unnamed) is the highest point in the Wichita Mountain range.

The Blue Canyon Wind Farm is north of Mount Scott, and the wind turbines are visible from the access road.

Routes

The summit is accessible by a three-mile paved road which winds around the mountain. Several scenic pullouts are located along the road, and parking is available at the top of the mountain.  Bicyclists and pedestrians are allowed on the road to the summit from sunrise to sunset. Although the distance is fairly short, the route is not recommended for beginners due to the steep grades, heavy crosswinds, and sharp turns.

The peak may also be reached by traditional hiking, though there are no blazed trails to the summit, and large pedestrian groups (of over 8 people) are prohibited on the paved road. However, visitors are allowed to park at the base of the mountain and hike to a number of the rock climbing areas available on the mountain.

References

External links
 

Landforms of Comanche County, Oklahoma
Scott
Tourist attractions in Comanche County, Oklahoma